Héctor Elías Barraza Chávez (born 11 June 1961) is a Mexican politician from the Party of the Democratic Revolution. From 2011 to 2012 he served as Deputy of the LXI Legislature of the Mexican Congress representing Sonora.

References

1961 births
Living people
Politicians from Sonora
Party of the Democratic Revolution politicians
20th-century Mexican politicians
21st-century Mexican politicians
Autonomous University of Chihuahua alumni
Members of the Congress of Chihuahua
Deputies of the LXI Legislature of Mexico
Members of the Chamber of Deputies (Mexico) for Sonora